Will (William T.) Johnson is an American composer and improviser.

Johnson, who was raised in Marietta, Georgia, earned a B.A. in music from Princeton University and an M.A. in music composition from the University of California, Berkeley. In 1966–67 he attended the composition seminar given by visiting professor Karlheinz Stockhausen at the University of California, Davis.

From 1969 until his retirement in 2010, Johnson was Professor of Music at Sonoma State University in Rohnert Park, California, where most of his music-making has been centered.

References

Sources

Further reading
Professor Johnson's SSU biography page (archive from 27 September 2011, accessed 4 August 2018)

American male composers
21st-century American composers
Living people
Sonoma State University faculty
Pupils of Karlheinz Stockhausen
21st-century American male musicians
Year of birth missing (living people)